Alpha Iota is a national collegiate professional and social sorority founded in 1925, for women in the field of business.

History 
Alpha Iota was founded on October 21, 1925 by Elsie M. Fenton at the American Institute of Business in Des Moines, Iowa for the purpose of promoting friendship among the students of that school.  Membership requirements are: Every girl must be a high school graduate or have had an equivalent education before entering this school, must be doing superior work as a student, and must be of good character and personality.

An review of the schools that hosted chapters shows that the initial focus of the sorority was to serve what today would be called secretarial or stenography schools, but was expanded during the Great Depression and WWII era to chapters at teachers colleges and full universities. The sorority's focus therefore shifted with the expansion of opportunities for women in business.

Alpha Iota was incorporated in early 1930, then opened 28 chapters that same year.

A 1932 Journal of Business Education notes that the organization already had over 60 chapters at publication. (Journal, v.8, Issue 2, 1932)

After a period of quick growth, membership dwindled in the postwar period.  A significant driver of this trend was the closure of many early business schools as they were displaced by junior, technical, and four-year colleges.

Today the fraternity is divided into five districts, mostly of alumnae chapters, with groups throughout the US and Canada.

Creed and Five Objects
The Creed of Alpha Iota is:
The purpose of Alpha Iota is to make each member a better business woman through development of self-confidence, leadership, and awareness of responsibility to herself and her community. A spirit of loyalty, friendship, participation and education, is fostered among all members.
Alpha Iota has set Five Objects as goals for its members:
1. To create and perpetuate a friendly spirit among students of our school.
2. To extend friendly courtesies to new students.
3. To build up a continued loyalty to our Alma Mater.
4. To create and perpetuate a friendly spirit among the members of the various chapters of Alpha Iota.
5. To help each other when possible in the securing of positions and promotions.

Milestones 
On April 11, 1930, Alpha Iota was incorporated under the laws of the State of Iowa as a non-profit organization with the right to grant charters and establish chapters throughout the United States and Canada.

The first Alumnae Chapter of Alpha Iota was organized May 28, 1930.

By the end of 1930, twenty-one charters had been granted.

Growth proceeded swiftly, with an emphasis on business schools. By 1932 it had over 4,000 members, growing to 8,000 by 1936. The society reached 10,000 members on June 19, 1937.

During WWII the sorority set a goal of raising $1M in war bonds for the purchase of a B-29 Super Fortress bomber.  They surpassed this goal in November and December 1944, raising $1,227,161, which paid for both a B-29 ($600,000), a heavy bomber ($250,000) and an additional $377,161 which went to help rehabilitate those wounded in service. The leading chapter in this effort was Beta Omicron chapter, of Charleston, SC.

Heartspring (formerly known as the Institute of Logopedics) was adopted as the Alpha Iota International Service Project in 1949. It remains one of the sorority's chosen philanthropy projects today.

National and district conventions are held biennially.

Traditions 
The sorority considers Phi Theta Pi to be its brother fraternity, a group with an active chapter on the Tiffin campus and which shares a similar emphasis at business schools.

One of Alpha Iota's traditions is the presentation of an award to the member with the highest scholastic average.  "The Scholarship Key continues to be a coveted award for members of the collegiate chapters."

Meetings are ended with a Benediction used by all chapters:
“We thank Thee, Father, for Thy gift of peace,
For love and loyal friends;
We pray that faith and courage may not cease,
Nor patience that transcends
The stress and strain the passing years may bring,
But grant us strength to face
The daily task with eager hearts that sing,
Enfolded in Thy grace.” Amen.

A song was published by the sorority in 1934, "The Sweetheart of Alpha Iota", written by Margaret D. O'Connor with music by Mary Alice Mullin.

Insignia 
The badge is described as a square shield with an Elizabethan, 3-lobed base and an eared, twice-engrailed top. At sides and bottom it has a wide gold border. Surmounting the shield are seven seed pearls, six more of which mark the border between the three fields, with an emerald? (optionally a ruby?) at the center. The lower field bears a cup, in gold. The badge may carry a chapter guard.

The Coat-of-arms includes these symbols: the Sphinx, the Rose, the Ionic Column, the Two Stars, the Open Book, and the Roman Fasces. At the bottom of the coat-of-arms are the Greek words, Alpha Iota.

The Colors of Alpha Iota are white and Royal blue.

The flower is the American Beauty Rose

The open motto is Study to Show Thyself Approved.

The publication was The Notebook, first published in 1931, now a quarterly publication.

Chapters 
This is a partial chapter list, of which there were already 60 by 1932. It appears there is at least one active undergraduate chapter today, along with a number of active alumnae chapters. Chapter information from national website. Inactive groups indicated by italics, active chapters in bold, and where status is unknown the name is in plain text.  When known, dates of inactivity are noted under status column.

See also 

 Professional fraternities and sororities

References 

1925 establishments in Iowa
Student organizations established in 1925